Justice Young may refer to:

Clarence Clifton Young, justice of the Supreme Court of Nevada
George B. Young, justice of the Minnesota Supreme Court
Howard Young Sr., justice of the Indiana Supreme Court
John E. Young, justice of the New Hampshire Supreme Court
Newton C. Young, justice of the North Dakota Supreme Court
Richard M. Young, justice of the Supreme Court of Illinois
Robert P. Young Jr., chief justice of the Michigan Supreme Court
Ron Young (judge), judge of the New Zealand High Court

See also
Young Justice, fictional DC Comics superhero team
Judge Young (disambiguation)